Carnival Conquest is a cruise ship owned and operated by Carnival Cruise Line. She is the first of her namesake class, whose design is derived from the Destiny-class of cruise ships. Sixty percent of her staterooms have ocean views, and sixty percent of those (37% of all cabins) have balconies. The ship's interior decor is of a French Impressionist style designed to complement the port city of New Orleans.  Carnival Conquest was renovated in 2009.

The Godmother of Carnival Conquest is Lindy Boggs, former US Congresswoman for Louisiana.

The vessel is currently homeported in Miami, Florida.

Incidents 

On 7 July 2013, the ship was diverted to Mobile, Alabama after a tugboat sank in New Orleans, causing a closure to the Mississippi River. Carnival then changed the next 7 day cruise roundtrip New Orleans into a 6-day cruise from Mobile to New Orleans. Passengers disembarking were provided charter buses to New Orleans.

See also
Cruise Confidential

References

External links 
 
 

Conquest
2002 ships
Ships built by Fincantieri
Ships built in Monfalcone